Sampathgiri is a huge hill in the centre of Polur, Tamil Nadu, India. This hill has been dedicated to Lord Narasimha and a temple was constructed in ancient times on the hill. Many celebrities and personalities have visited this temple and donated to its renovation. South Indian actor Sivaji Ganesan donated a huge amount for the renovation of the steps to the temple on the hill.

Hills of Tamil Nadu
Tiruvannamalai district